Agonopterix hesphoea is a moth in the family Depressariidae. It was described by Ronald W. Hodges in 1975. It is found in North America, where it has been recorded from Texas.

References

Moths described in 1975
Agonopterix
Moths of North America